Frances McCollin (October 24, 1892 – February 25, 1960) was an American composer and musician, who was blind from early childhood. She was the first woman to win the Clemson Prize from the American Guild of Organists. In 1951, she was named a Distinguished Daughter of Pennsylvania.

Early life and education
Her father, a lawyer, had studied musical composition in college, and he wrote and performed music as a side interest throughout his life. Her grandfather, George T. Lanigan, was an Irish-Canadian poet and journalist. Her younger sister, Katherine Williams McCollin Arnett, known as "Kitty", was a singer and composer and the mother of Edward Arnett.

When Frances McCollin was five years old, she became blind, probably from congenital glaucoma. Her parents and extended family took an energetic approach to her education at home, focused on music. When she started to compose in girlhood, her father was her first teacher and transcriber.  As a child, she described sensations consistent with synaesthesia, associating musical keys and colors (green for E major, pink for F major, for example). As a young woman she studied with fellow blind musician David Duffield Wood, the organist at St. Stephen's Church in Philadelphia, and at the Pennsylvania Institute for Instruction of the Blind.

Career
In her lifetime, McCollin's works were performed frequently by professional and amateur vocal ensembles, and by orchestras including the Philadelphia Orchestra, the Warsaw Philharmonic, the Vancouver Symphony, and others. She met Marian Anderson, Igor Stravinsky, Amy Beach, and other musicians and composers, usually in connection with her mother's work with the Philadelphia Orchestra. Fabien Sevitzky, Eugene Ormandy, and Leopold Stokowski took particular interest in her compositions. McCollin defended Stokowski programming The Internationale for a Philadelphia youth concert in 1934.

Among the honors McCollin won were a first prize from the Manuscript Music Society of Philadelphia in 1916, and the Philadelphia Matinee Musical Club's annual prize in 1918. Also in 1918, she became the first woman to win the Clemson Prize from the American Guild of Organists, and the Kimball Company Prize from the Chicago Madrigal Club.  In 1931 her composition "Spring in Heaven" won the Federation Prize from the National Federation of Music Clubs. In 1951, she was named a Distinguished Daughter of Pennsylvania.

She gave popular weekly lectures about the Philadelphia Orchestra programs, in which she focused on explaining modern compositions. She also hosted a weekly radio show for children, the "Aunt Frances Music Hour." She conducted a girls' choir at the School for the Blind in West Philadelphia, and the Girls' Glee Club at Swarthmore College one year (1923-1924). In 1943, the Philadelphia Orchestra's "Request Program" featured works voted into the program by the public; Frances McCollin's "Pavane" was included as a top vote-getter, the only winning composition by a woman.

Personal life
McCollin was in poor health in her last years, and lived with her sister Kitty (who had married a doctor, John Hancock Arnett). When she died in 1960, aged 67 years, members of the Philadelphia Orchestra played a string quartet she composed at her memorial service.

Her scores and other papers are archived at the Free Library of Philadelphia. Another collection of her papers is at the University of Pennsylvania.

Selected works 
Among her compositions include:

 Now All the Woods Are Sleeping
 All Glory, Laud and Honor
 Christmas Fantasia, for organ
 Sleep, Holy Babe, for solo voice and string orchestra
 Come Hither, Ye Faithful, for choir
 Pavane
 Spring in Heaven (1931)
 How Firm a Foundation, a chorale cantata based on the tune St. Denio (1943)

References

External links
An audio sample of McCollin's setting of "In the Bleak Midwinter", from the Elektra Women's Choir website
The score for "The Singing Leaves" (1918), a cantata by Frances McCollin for women's voices, text by James Russell Lowell

1892 births
1960 deaths
20th-century American composers
Musicians from Philadelphia
American women composers
20th-century American women musicians
20th-century organists
Classical musicians from Pennsylvania
American organists
Women organists
Blind musicians
20th-century women composers